Edward "Ted" Slevin (15 July 1927 – 7 November 1998) was an English professional rugby league footballer who played in the 1940s, 1950s and 1960s.

Background
Ted Slevin was born in Rossington, Doncaster, West Riding of Yorkshire, England, he and his family moved to Lancashire when he was just a few months old, he was later the landlord of The Beech Tree, Beech Hill Lane, Wigan, and he died aged 71.

Club career

Wigan
Ted Slevin made his début for Wigan in the 14-12 victory over Leeds at Headingley Rugby Stadium, Leeds on Saturday 8 January 1949, he scored his first try for Wigan in the 19-5 victory over St. Helens at Central Park, Wigan on Friday 15 April 1949, he scored his last try (2-tries) for Wigan in the 22-13 victory over St. Helens at Central Park, Wigan on Friday 23 March 1951, and he played his last match for Wigan in the 46-0 victory over Liverpool City at Central Park, Wigan on Saturday 6 October 1951.

Slevin played in Wigan's 20-2 victory over Huddersfield in the Championship Final during the 1949–50 season at Maine Road, Manchester on Saturday 13 May 1950, played in Wigan's victory  in the Lancashire County League during the 1949–50 season, and played right-, i.e. number 10, in the 20-7 victory over Leigh in the 1949–50 Lancashire County Cup Final during the 1949–50 season at Wilderspool Stadium, Warrington on Saturday 29 October 1949.

Slevin played left-, i.e. number 11, and scored a try in the 28-5 victory over Warrington in the 1950–51 Lancashire County Cup Final during the 1950–51 season at Station Road, Swinton on Saturday 4 November 1950, and played right-, i.e. number 12, in Wigan's 10–0 victory over Barrow in the Challenge Cup Final at Wembley Stadium, London on Saturday 5 May 1951.

Huddersfield
Slevin played in Huddersfield's victory in the Yorkshire County League during the 1951–52 season. Slevin played left-, i.e. number 8, in the 15-10 victory over St. Helens in the 1953–54 Challenge Cup Final during the 1952–53 season at Wembley Stadium, London  on Saturday 25 April 1953, in front of a crowd of 89,588, and played in the 18-8 victory over Batley in the 1952–53 Yorkshire County Cup Final during the 1952–53 season at Headingley Rugby Stadium, Leeds on Saturday 15 November 1952.

Slevin played left- in the 15-8 victory over York in the 1957–58 Yorkshire County Cup Final during the 1957–58 season at Headingley Rugby Stadium, Leeds on Saturday 19 October 1957, played left- in the 10–16 defeat by Wakefield Trinity in the 1960–61 Yorkshire County Cup Final during the 1960–61 season at Headingley Rugby Stadium, Leeds on Saturday 29 October 1960. Slevin played in the 6-12 defeat by Wakefield Trinity in the 1961–62 Challenge Cup Final during the 1961–62 season at Wembley Stadium, London on Saturday 12 May 1962, in front of a crowd of 81,263, and played in the 14-5 victory over Wakefield Trinity in the Championship Final during the 1961–62 season at Odsal Stadium, Bradford on Saturday 19 May 1962.

Testimonial match
Slevin's Testimonial match at Huddersfield took place in 1962.

All Six Cups
Only five rugby league footballers have won "All Six Cups" during their career, they are; Aubrey Casewell (while at Salford and Leeds), Alan Edwards (while at Salford and Bradford Northern), John Etty (while at Oldham and Wakefield Trinity), Ted Slevin (while at Wigan and Huddersfield), and Derek Turner (while at Oldham and Wakefield Trinity). "All Six Cups" being the Challenge Cup, Championship, Lancashire County Cup, Lancashire County League, Yorkshire County Cup and Yorkshire League.

In 1999, Slevin was one of 21 players inducted into Huddersfield's Hall of Fame.

Representative career

County honours
Slevin played left-, i.e. number 8, and scored a try in Lancashire's 12-3 victory over Yorkshire at Thrum Hall, Halifax on Tuesday 3 May 1949.

International honours
Slevin won caps for England while at Wigan in 1950 against Wales, and while at Huddersfield in 1953 against France. Slevin also represented Great Britain while at Huddersfield in 1953 against France, and in 1954 against France (2 non-Test matches). Along with William "Billy" Banks, Edward "Ted" Cahill, Gordon Haynes, Keith Holliday, William "Billy" Ivison, Robert "Bob" Kelly, John McKeown and George Parsons, Slevin's only Great Britain appearances came against France prior to 1957, these matches were not considered as Test matches by the Rugby Football League, and consequently caps were not awarded.

Genealogical information
Ted Slevin's marriage to Kathleen (née Moss) was registered during third ¼ 1950 in Wigan district. They had children; Bryan E. Slevin (birth registered during second ¼  in Ince district), and Jeffrey P. Slevin (birth registered during first ¼  in Wigan district). Ted Slevin was the son of John Slevin and Edith "Edy" (née Lawton) (marriage registered first ¼ 1922 in Prescot district), and the younger brother of John "Jack" Slevin (birth registered third ¼ 1922 in Prescot district).

References

External links
Search for "Ted Slevin" at britishnewspaperarchive.co.uk
Search for "Edward Slevin" at britishnewspaperarchive.co.uk

1927 births
1998 deaths
England national rugby league team players
English rugby league players
Great Britain national rugby league team players
Huddersfield Giants players
Lancashire rugby league team players
People from Rossington
Publicans
Rochdale Hornets players
Rugby league players from Doncaster
Rugby league props
Rugby league second-rows
Wigan Warriors players